The helicotrema (from  [helix] meaning coil and  [trēma] meaning hole) is the part of the cochlear labyrinth where the scala tympani and the scala vestibuli meet. It is the main component of the cochlear apex. The hair cells near this area best detect low frequency sounds.

Structure 
The helicotrema is a part of the cochlear labyrinth where the scala tympani and the scala vestibuli meet. It is the main component of the cochlear apex.

Function 
The helicotrema connects the scala tympani and the scala vestibuli. This allows fluid to move between the two. It slightly impedes the travel of sound. The hair cells near this area best detect low frequency sounds.

Clinical significance 
The hair cells near the helicotrema are at higher risk of acoustic trauma than those in most other parts of the cochlea. It is also important during ear surgery. When pressure is placed on the perilymph in the cochlea, it reduces pressure and prevents damage to the organ of Corti.

References

External links 
 Histology at Allegheny University of the Health Sciences
 Diagram at IUPUI

Ear